A list of films produced in Italy in 1993 (see 1993 in film):

External links
Italian films of 1993 at the Internet Movie Database

1993
Films
Italian